Richie Cole (February 29, 1948 – May 2, 2020) was an American jazz saxophonist, composer, and arranger.

Early life
Cole was born in Trenton, New Jersey. He began to play alto saxophone when he was ten years old, encouraged by his father, who owned a jazz club in New Jersey. He was a graduate of Ewing High School, in Ewing Township, New Jersey. Cole won a scholarship from DownBeat magazine to attend the Berklee School of Music in Boston.

Career 
In 1969, he joined drummer Buddy Rich's Big Band. After working with Lionel Hampton's Big Band and Doc Severinsen's Big Band, he formed his own quintet and toured worldwide, developing his own "alto madness" bebop style in the 1970s and early 1980s. He formed the Alto Madness Orchestra in the 1990s.

Cole performed and recorded with Eddie Jefferson, Nancy Wilson, Tom Waits, The Manhattan Transfer, Hank Crawford, Freddie Hubbard, Eric Kloss, Bobby Enriquez, Phil Woods, Sonny Stitt, Art Pepper, and Boots Randolph. He recorded over fifty albums, including his albums Hollywood Madness (Muse, 1979) and Richie Cole Plays West Side Story (Music Masters, 1997), a tribute to Leonard Bernstein.

He was appointed to the Board of the National Jazz Service Organization and the Board for the National Endowment for the Arts where he served as chairman for one year. He was a charter member of the International Association of Jazz Educators.

In 2005, he was awarded the State of California Congressional Certificate of Lifetime Achievement in Jazz on behalf of the Temecula Jazz Society.

Cole died of natural causes on May 2, 2020.

Personal life
Cole was briefly engaged to actress Brenda Vaccaro in 1979. He has two daughters, Amanda Marrazzo, a Writer/Reporter/Producer and Annie Cole, a Music Agent.

Discography

As leader
 Trenton Makes, the World Takes (Progressive, 1976)
 Starburst with Reuben Brown Trio (Adelphi, 1976) 
 Battle of the Saxes with Eric Kloss (Muse, 1976)
 New York Afternoon with Eddie Jefferson (Muse, 1977)
 Alto Madness with Eddie Jefferson (Muse, 1978)
 Keeper of the Flame with Eddie Jefferson (Muse, 1979)
 Hollywood Madness with Eddie Jefferson, The Manhattan Transfer (Muse, 1979)
 Side by Side with Phil Woods (Muse, 1980)
 Cool 'C'  (Muse, 1981)
 Tokyo Madness (Seven Seas/King [Japan], 1981)
 Alive! at the Village Vanguard (Muse, 1981)
 Return to Alto Acres with Art Pepper (Palo Alto, 1982)
 The Wildman Meets the Madman with Bobby Enriquez (GNP Crescendo, 1982)
 Yakety Madness! with Boots Randolph (Palo Alto, 1983)
 Alto Annie's Theme (Palo Alto, 1983)
 Some Things Speak For Themselves (Muse, 1983)
 Bossa Nova Eyes (Palo Alto, 1985)
 Pure Imagination (Concord Jazz, 1986)
 Popbop (Milestone, 1987)
 Signature (Milestone, 1988)
 Bossa International with Hank Crawford (Milestone, 1990)
 Profile (Heads Up, 1993)
 Kush: The Music of Dizzy Gillespie (Heads Up, 1996)
 West Side Story (Venus [Japan], MusicMasters, 1996)
 Trenton Style (Jazz Excursion, 1998)
 Pure Madness (32 Jazz, 1999) compilation
 Come Sunday: My Kind Of Religion (Jazz Excursion, 2000)
 A Tribute to Our Buddies (Fresh Sound, 2004)
 Back on Top (Jazz Excursion, 2005)
 A Piece of History (Jazz Excursion, 2006)
 Rise's Rose Garden (Jazz Excursion, 2006)
 The Man with the Horn (Jazz Excursion, 2007)
 Live at KUVO 2/11/08 (Jazz Excursion, 2008)
 Bebop Express (Jazz Excursion, 2008)
 The KUVO Sessions, Volume 2 (Jazz Excursion, 2009)
 Castle Bop with Emil Viklicky (Multisonic, 2011)
 Vocal Madness with Uptown Vocal Jazz Quartet (House Cat, 2014)
 Breakup Madness (Akashic, 2014)
 Mile Hi Madness (Akashic, 2015)
 Pittsburgh (Richie Cole Presents, 2015)
 Plays Ballads and Love Songs (Richie Cole Presents, 2016)
 Have Yourself an Alto Madness Christmas (Richie Cole Presents, 2016)
 The Many Minds of Richie Cole (Richie Cole Presents, 2017)
 Latin Lover (Richie Cole Presents, 2017)
 Cannonball (Richie Cole Presents, 2018)
 The Keys of Cool with Tony Monaco (Richie Cole Presents, 2019)

As sideman
With Greg Abate
 Dr. Jekyll & Mr. Hyde (Candid, 1995)
With Les DeMerle
 You're the Bop! A Jazz Portrait of Cole Porter (Summit, 2001)
With Allan Harris
 The Genius of Eddie Jefferson (Resilience Music Alliance, 2018)
With Jim Holman
 Explosion! (Delmark, 2012)
With Freddie Hubbard
 Back to Birdland (Real Time, 1982; Drive Archive, 1994; West Wind, 2002)
With Eddie Jefferson
Still on the Planet (Muse, 1976)
The Main Man (Inner CIty 1977)
The Live-Liest (Muse 1979)
 Vocal Ease (32 Records, 1999; Savoy, 2003)
With Vic Juris
Roadsong (Muse, 1978)
With Peter Lauffer
 Keys to the Heart (Peter Lauffer/CD Baby, 2010)
With The Manhattan Transfer
 Extensions (Atlantic, 1979)
 Mecca for Moderns (Atlantic, 1981)
 Vocalese (Atlantic, 1985)
With Karen Marguth
 A Way With Words (Wayfae Music/CD Baby, 2013)
With Mark Murphy
 Bop For Kerouac (Muse, 1981)
With Oliver Nelson
 Swiss Suite (Flying Dutchman/RCA, 1971)
With Anita O'Day
 Big Band at Carnegie Hall (Emily, 2009)
With Don Patterson
 Movin' Up! (Muse, 1977)
With Buddy Rich
 Keep the Customer Satisfied (Liberty 1970)
With Red Rodney
Home Free (Muse, 1977 [1979])
Red, White and Blues (Muse, 1978)
The 3R's (Muse, 1979 [1982]) with Ricky Ford
With Janine Santana
 Soft as Granite (Janine Santana/CD Baby, 2008) 
With Sigmund Snopek III
 Virginia Woolf (Gear Fab, 2000)
With Sonny Stitt
Just in Case You Forgot How Bad He Really Was [live; rec. 1981] (32 Jazz, 1998)
With James Van Buren
 Live at the Kasbah (Van Buren Records and Tapes/CD Baby, 2003)
With Patrice Villastrigo
 Golden Orchid (Skinny Llama/CD Baby, 2010)

DVDs
 From Village Vanguard [includes both the Johnny Griffin Quartet and the Richie Cole Group (a quintet) in two separate sets/performances; recorded 1981] (2004)
 Eddie Jefferson in Concert Featuring Richie Cole: Live from the Jazz Showcase Recorded at Joe Segal's Jazz Showcase in Chicago on May 6, 1979 (50 minutes)
 Jazz Legends Live! – part 9 of 13 in this series, starring Dexter Gordon, Gary Burton, Billy Cobham, Ahmad Jamal, Carmen McRae, and Richie Cole (1 song - "Confirmation" - 4 minutes)
 Cool Summer [includes both the Stan Getz Quartet and Alto Madness (Richie's quintet with Bobby Enriquez) in two separate sets/performances at the Paul Masson Winery in California as part of the "Harvest Jazz" TV series; recorded 1981]

References

External links
 Official website
 
 "Richie Cole: A Wiser But Still Swinging' Soul" by Samuel Chell

American jazz alto saxophonists
American male saxophonists
1948 births
2020 deaths
Musicians from Trenton, New Jersey
Berklee College of Music alumni
Heads Up International artists
Milestone Records artists
Muse Records artists
Palo Alto Records artists
21st-century American saxophonists
21st-century American male musicians
American male jazz musicians
Ewing High School (New Jersey) alumni
People from Ewing Township, New Jersey
20th-century American saxophonists